Day Harbor is a bay on the Kenai Peninsula of Alaska, United States. It received its name in 1787 from Captain Portlock, due to the fact that travel to the head of the bay from Seward typically takes 12 hours. The bay is 25 miles from Seward, and is accessible only by boat. It is a gently curving J-shaped bay separated on the west from nearby Resurrection Bay by the Resurrection Peninsula. Recreational boaters often anchor at one of the two State Marine Parks due to the often choppy seas and unstable weather of outer Day Harbor. Lesser used anchorages on the eastern shore include Anchor Cove and Bowen Anchorage. Popular activities in the bay include hiking to Ellsworth Lake at the head of the bay where the retreating Ellsworth Glacier calves.

The majority of the land surrounding Day Harbor is private, with over 400 different properties.

Parks
The bay is home to two Alaska State Parks. The primary activity in the park is boating for either fishing or sightseeing purposes, it is mostly a day-use park due to the lack of any facilities on shore. It is also undeveloped but offers a good spot for beach camping, a small freshwater lake, and access to the high country of the Resurrection Peninsula.

References

External links
Map of Driftwood Bay
Map Of Safety Cove

Bays of Alaska
Bodies of water of Kenai Peninsula Borough, Alaska